Cristian Adrián Machín Ramírez (born December 5, 1988) is an Uruguayan footballer who plays for Boston River in the Uruguayan Segunda División. He was born in Montevideo, Uruguay.

Teams
  Fénix 2006-2012
  Atlético Rafaela 2012–2013
  Boston River 2013–present

References
 
 

1988 births
Living people
Uruguayan footballers
Uruguayan expatriate footballers
Centro Atlético Fénix players
Atlético de Rafaela footballers
Boston River players
Argentine Primera División players
Expatriate footballers in Argentina
Association football defenders